Somatochlora meridionalis, the Balkan emerald, is a species of dragonfly in the family Corduliidae. It occurs in southeastern Europe from France to the Czech Republic to Turkey. It is found at narrow, shallow, shaded streams.

References

Corduliidae
Insects described in 1935